Kayden Kross (born 1985) is an American pornographic actress and director. She is a member of the AVN and XRCO Halls of Fame.

Early life
Kross grew up in the foothills between Sacramento and Placerville. She has described herself as "the book nerd" during her time as a high school student. Kross began stripping at Rick's Showgirls in Rancho Cordova, California when she was eighteen years old to earn extra money to rescue a pony from a slaughter house, which she kept for eight months. She was later contacted by an agent, whose business relationship provided Kross with the opportunity of modeling in adult magazines.

Career 
Her movies with Vivid included Kayden's First Time, Hard Time, and Be Here Now. Unhappy with the company, she became a free agent one year later when she did not renew her contract. She signed an exclusive contract with Adam & Eve after one month of being a free agent.
She was named Penthouse Pet of the Month for September 2008. Kross' official website, ClubKayden.com, was launched on September 2, 2008. Kross has hosted a blog at UnKrossed.com and has written regular updates and opinion columns for MikeSouth.com, an adult industry gossip blog, among other sites.

Kross became exclusive to Digital Playground under a multi-year contract on January 1, 2010. Her first movie with the company, The Smiths, topped sales charts immediately and has continued to be a best seller. She was given the lead in their big budget feature, Body Heat, in her third month in contract. She won two Best Actress Awards for the role.

Kross hosted the 2010 AVN Awards show, along with porn actress Kirsten Price and comedian Dave Attell. She was Penthouse magazine's "Cover Girl" for September 2008 and 2010.  Kross starred in the 2010 AVN Best Feature The 8th Day and portrayed the role of Elin Nordegren, wife of Tiger Woods, in Adam & Eve Pictures' film Tyler's Wood.

In 2012, she hosted the Xbiz awards for the second time, and appeared in the ceremony alongside Wicked Pictures/Wicked.com contract star, Jessica Drake, and on the AVN red carpet with co-hosts Jesse Jane and guitarist Dave Navarro.

In 2019, she launched Deeper, one of the Vixen Media Group's primary websites in its portfolio.

Appearances in other media
Kross has made appearances in the FX's comedy series The League, the G4 reality series The Block, and  Family Jewels.

In 2011, she was cast as Tara in Gregory Hatanaka's drama Blue Dream briefly co-hosted a regular videocast, Kayden's Review, for Triggla TV alongside the comedian Dane Hanson. From 2012 - 2013, Kross portrayed a main character in the second season of Tucky Williams' lesbian-themed web series Girl/Girl Scene. Starting from January 2013 Kross hosts the weekly call-in show Krossfire on Playboy Radio.

In 2013, Kross also appeared in the featurette "Chicks 'N Guns" on the Breaking Bad 5th season DVD as a stripper. The scene takes place during the season 5 episode "Gliding Over All". Kross also appeared in two music videos from the band Nekrogoblikon, "No One Survives" in 2012 and "We Need a Gimmick" in 2015.

Writing
Kross writes columns regularly for publications such as Complex magazine, XBIZ magazine, and a blog for xcritic.com. She has also contributed to Timothy McSweeney's Internet Tendency, and her short story "Plank" appeared in the 2012 short story collection Forty Stories: New Writing from Harper Perennial, an e-book. As of August 2012, she was writing an autobiographical book about the porn industry.

Adult industry activism
In 2008, she was among those testifying against a proposed tax in California on all producers and distributors of adult entertainment. In February 2012, she and conservative pundit Wendy Murphy appeared on Stossel, with host John Stossel, to discuss legislation in California that would require that condoms be used during the production of adult movies.

Personal life
In October 2008, Kross was charged with grand theft and violations of the California Civil Code, involving contracts for purchases of home equity mortgages. In July 2009, the grand-theft charge was dismissed, and the real-estate-fraud charge was reduced to a misdemeanor; Kross pleaded no contest to the resulting charges and was sentenced to one day in custody and three years of probation. She blamed her involvement in the situation on her naïveté and being scammed by the broker and mortgage lender.

Kross and her French partner Manuel Ferrara have one daughter, born in January 2014. In 2013, Ferrara asked her to no longer perform with other men. Ferrara continues to shoot scenes with other women, occasionally scenes which are directed by Kross. They acknowledged the seeming double standard of their arrangement but agreed that his work would stay professional and that Kross maintains "veto" power over who performs with Manuel. He also related that if she wished for him to stop performing altogether, he would.

Awards
As a performer

As a director

Mainstream filmography

References

External links

 
 Personal blog site
 
 
 
 

1985 births
21st-century American women writers
Actresses from Sacramento, California
American bloggers
American columnists
American female adult models
American pornographic film actresses
American women short story writers
American short story writers
California State University, Sacramento alumni
Living people
Penthouse Pets
Pornographic film actors from California
Writers from Sacramento, California
American women columnists
American women bloggers
21st-century American short story writers
American women non-fiction writers
21st-century American non-fiction writers